Luis Zapata Quiroz (27 April 1951 – 4 November 2020) was one of the most prominent gay writers in Mexican literature.

Career
Born in Chilpancingo, Guerrero, on 27 April 1951, Luis Zapata studied French literature at the National Autonomous University of Mexico (UNAM). In addition to his novels (most famously, El vampiro de la colonia Roma, 1979), he also wrote plays and short stories and was active in the field of cultural journalism. He was also a specialist translator of medieval French. 

Zapata died in Mexico City on 4 November 2020, after being hospitalized in Morelos a month earlier.

Select Novels
 Hasta en las mejores familias (Even in the Best of Families), 1975
 El vampiro de la colonia Roma (Adonis Garcia, A Picaresque Novel), 1979
 De pétalos perennes (Perennial Petals), 1981
 Melodrama, 1983
 En jirones (In Tatters), 1985
 La hermana secreta de Angélica María (Angélica Maria's Secret Sister), 1989
 ¿Por qué mejor no nos vamos? (Why Don't We Just Leave?), 1992
 La más fuerte pasión (The Strongest Passion), 1995
 Los postulados del buen golpista, 1995
 Siete noches junto al mar, 1999
 La historia de siempre (The Same Story As Always), 2007
 Escena y farsa es la vida (2014)
 Como sombras y sueños (2014)
 Autobiografía póstuma (2014)

References

1951 births
Mexican male novelists
20th-century Mexican male writers
21st-century Mexican male writers
Gay novelists
Mexican LGBT novelists
2020 deaths
Writers from Guerrero